Kasper Woldemar Hämäläinen (born 8 August 1986) is a Finnish professional football attacking midfielder who plays for Ykkönen side TPS and the Finland national team. Hämäläinen was born in Turku, Finland, where he started his senior career in TPS before moving to Djurgården. Hämäläinen made his international debut for Finland in November 2008 and has since had over 60 caps, including appearing in Finland´s UEFA Euro 2020 campaign in which Finland national team secured its first place in European Football Championship tournament´s group stage.

Club career

TPS Turku
Born in Turku, Hämäläinen started his career in his hometown club TPS. In June 2008, Portuguese Primeira Liga club C.D. Nacional was keen to sign him, but he was said to be too expensive. He visited Italian clubs Roma, Lazio, Udinese and Siena. NEC also showed interest. After the 2008 season, he was near a move to an unnamed Italian club but he chose to stay in Turku to secure play time in the first team.

Djurgårdens IF
In December 2009, it was announced that Swedish club Djurgården had acquired him. "Kasper" as his shirt says became a star in the Djurgården-shirt and started all the 30 league games in Allsvenskan during both the 2010 and 2011 season. During his two first season he played as a central midfielder besides his fellow country man Daniel Sjölund. In the 2012 pre-season Djurgården manager Magnus Pehrsson tried Hämäläinen in a more offensive role as a trequartista. Hämäläinen did it so well that the move became permanent.

Lech Poznań
However, in January 2013, it was announced that Hämäläinen had signed a three-year contract with Polish top-flight side Lech Poznań. The transfer fee was never made public, but it was believed to be around €250.000  On 24 February, he scored on his debut in a 4–0 away win over Ruch Chorzów. Hämäläinen gained 14 caps during the spring season of 2013 out of which he was in the starting eleven 12 times. In those 14 matches he scored three goals. Lech Poznań won silver medals and made it to UEFA Europa League qualifications for the next season.

Legia Warsaw

On 11 January 2016, he joined Lech's archrivals Legia Warsaw on a free transfer, signing a -year deal.

Jablonec

On 6 September 2019, Hämäläinen joined Czech First League club FK Jablonec, signing a two-year deal.

Return to TPS

On 7 May 2021, it was announced that Hämäläinen would return to TPS with a 2.5-year contract.

International career
Hämäläinen was part of the Finnish U17 team that represented in the 2003 U17 World Cup held in Finland. He was a regular member of the Finland U21 team that qualified to the 2009 U21 European Championship held in Sweden and played in all Finland's three matches.

He made his national team debut on 19 November 2008 against Switzerland when Stuart Baxter chose him to the starting line up for a match played in St. Gallen. During UEFA Euro 2012 qualifying he established himself as a regular in the national team. Hämäläinen scored his first international goal on 17 November 2010 against San Marino as he scored a brace in the 8–0 home victory.

Personal life
Hämäläinen's father Heikki Hämäläinen is a former track and field athlete.

Career statistics

Club

1 Including Polish SuperCup.

International

International goals

As of match played 1 June 2016. Finland score listed first, score column indicates score after each Hämäläinen goal.

Honours

Lech Poznań
Ekstraklasa: 2014–15
Polish Super Cup: 2015

Legia Warsaw
Ekstraklasa: 2015–16, 2016–17, 2017–18
Polish Cup: 2015–16, 2017–18

References

External links

 FK Jablonec official profile  
 Kasper Hämäläinen – SPL competition record  
 
 
 
 
 
 

1986 births
Living people
Footballers from Turku
Association football midfielders
Finnish footballers
Finnish expatriate footballers
Finland international footballers
Finland under-21 international footballers
Finland youth international footballers
Turun Palloseura footballers
Djurgårdens IF Fotboll players
Lech Poznań players
Legia Warsaw players
Veikkausliiga players
Allsvenskan players
Ekstraklasa players
Expatriate footballers in Sweden
Expatriate footballers in Poland
Swedish-speaking Finns
Finnish expatriate sportspeople in Sweden
Finnish expatriate sportspeople in Poland
FK Jablonec players
Czech First League players
Expatriate footballers in the Czech Republic
Finnish expatriate sportspeople in the Czech Republic